Sociology of Religion is a 1920 book by Max Weber, a German economist and sociologist. The original edition was in German.

Max Weber studied the effects of religious action and inaction. He views religion by simply categorized different religions in order to fully understand religion's subjective meaning to the individual (Verstehen).

By viewing religion strictly in the scientific sense, Weber was striving for objectivity, attempting to ignore value judgments, and to understand religion as those human responses that give meaning to the inescapable problems of existence, such as birth, death, illness, aging, injustice, tragedy, and suffering. In The Sociology of Religion, Weber proposes that people pursue their own goals, and that religion facilitates that. He shows how early religious beliefs stem from the work of skillful, charismatic individuals, and how their actions are eventually transformed into a systematic, church-based religion - in other words, how religion begins with charismatic authority and is transformed into traditional authority.

Because religion enables people to pursue their interests, Weber believed that religion actually gave rise to the spread of modern capitalism, as he asserted in The Protestant Ethic and the Spirit of Capitalism. This writing illustrated the way in which religious beliefs steered the direction of the economic and technological forces that were already in motion.

Max Weber takes an objective, distant view of the sociological traditions of the institution of religion. He is standing on the outside, looking in, contrary to the believers whose journey of faith causes them to examine their religion from within.  This detached, objective view of religion embodies the objective, modernist practice of the sociological perspective of religion today.

Table of contents

(A) Origins of Religion
1) Primordial Notions Of Religion
a) Viewpoint
b) This-worldly Orientation
c) Magic
d) Charisma
e) Belief in Spirits
f) Ecstasy and Orgy
g) Soul and Supernatural Power

2) Symbolism
a) Fear of Soul
b) Displacement of Naturalism
c) Spread of Symbolism
d) Stereotyping Effect
e) Transitions
f) Mythological Analogy

3) Concepts Of God
a) Enduring Being
b) Pantheon
c) Roman Gods
d) Gods of Economy
e) Earthly and Heavenly Gods
f) Specialization of Gods
g) Gods of Household
h) Political God
1) God of Israel
2) Local God and Foreign God
3) City-state God
4) Bands and God
i) Monotheism
1) Primary God
2) Divine Order
3) Universalism

(B) Emergence of Religion

1) Religion And God
a) Coercion of God
b) Worship Of God
1) Prayer
2) Sacrifice
c) Definition Of Religion

2) Priest
a) Cult
b) Enterprise
c) Doctrine
d) Sociological Definition

3) Development Of The Notion Of Supernatural
a) Demonstration Of Power
b) Attribute of Failure
c) Differentiation of Supernatural
d) Ethical God
e) Divination
f) God of Law
g) Impersonal Powers

4) Development Of Religious Ethic
a) Taboo
b) Totemism
c) Table-Community
d) Taboo and Social Intercourse
e) Caste Ethic
f) Concept of Sin
g) Religious Ethic
h) Systematization of Ethic

(C) Prophet

1) Definition
a) Priest And Prophet
b) Magician And Prophet
c) Prophetic Age
d) Lawgiver and Prophet
1) Moses
e) Prophet and Social Policy
f) Tyrant and Prophet
g) Ethic Teacher and Prophet
1) Guru
h) Philosopher
i) Reformer
j) Mystery Cultist

2) Natures Of Prophecy
a) Ethical and Exemplary Prophecy
b) God and Prophets
1) God as Rainmaker
2) Gods of Near East
c) Prophetic Revelation

(D) Religious Community

1) Origins Of Religious Community
a) Prophetic Community
b) Cultic Community
c) Exemplary Community and Lay Devotee
d) Occasional Lay Society
e) Lay Community
f) Parish and Sect

2) Development Of Religious Community
a) Prophet vs. Priest
b) Scripture
1) Oral Tradition
2) Canonization
3) Priestly Education
c) Development of Dogma
1) Religious Community
2) Priest's Interests
3) Conditions in World Religions
4) Christian Dogma
5) Dogma in Other Religions
d) Preaching and Pastoral Care
e) Priestly Rationalization of Ethic
f) Magicalization of Priestly Religion
g) Popularization of Prophetic Religion

(E) Religiosity of Social Strata

1) Peasant
a) Ancient Israel
b) Passivity of Peasant
c) Zoroastrianism
d) Judaism
e) Christianity

2) Warrior Aristocrats
a) Warrior's Conduct of Life
b) Prophecy and Warrior
c) Holy War
d) Mithraism

3) Bureaucrats
a) Confucianism

4) Citizen
a) Wealthy Citizen
b) Middle-Class
c) Petty-Citizen
d) Christianity
e) Occident and Oriental City
f) Rationality of Citizen's Life
g) Development of Citizenry Rationalism

5) Slave And Propertyless

6) Mass Religiosity: Magic And Savior

7) Women And Religion

8) Social Strata And Sense Of Dignity
a) Legitimacy of Fortunate
b) Compensation of Disprivileged

9) Pariah Status
a) Jews and Hindu Castes
b) Jewish Resentment
c) Theodicy of Disprivilege
1) Jewish Theodicy
2) Jesus's Teaching
3) Buddhist Doctrine

(F) Intellectualism and Religion

1) Privileged Intellectualism
a) Priest
b) Privileged Lay Intellectuals

2) Intellectual Salvation
a) Social Conditions
b) Asia
c) Near East and West
d) Intellectual Characters

3) Non-privileged Intellectualism
a) Pariah And Petty-citizen Intellectualism
b) Ancient Judaism

4) Intellectualism And Christianity
a) Paul's Petty-citizen Intellectualism
b) Dogmatic Intellectualism
c) Anti-intellectualism of Christianity
1) Carriers of Religion
d) Intellectualism in Medieval Christianity
e) Humanist Intellectualism
f) Puritan Intellectualism

5) Modern Intellectualism
a) Anglo-Saxon and Latin Intellectualism
b) German Intellectualism
c) Socialism
d) Russian Intellectualism
e) Enlightenment Intellectualism

(G) Theodicy and Salvation

1) Theodicy
a) Transcendental Creator
b) Problem Of Theodicy
c) Advent Solution
d) Concept of Other World
e) Solution by Predestination
f) Providence
g) Solution by Dualism
h) Solution by Karma

2) Salvation And Rebirth
a) Promise of Wealth
b) Political Salvation
c) Salvation from Evil
d) Other-worldly Salvation
e) Salvation and Conduct of Life
f) Sanctification and Rebirth

3) Salvation By Ritual
a) Ritual Mood
b) Ritual Mysticism
c) Sacrament
d) Confessional
e) Puritan Rites
f) Jewish Ritualism

4) Salvation By Good Works
a) Account for Every Action
b) Total Personality

5) Salvation By Self-perfection
a) Animistic Methodology
b) Induction of Ecstasy
c) Development of Methodology
1) Transcendental God
2) States of Sanctification
3) Indian Methodology
4) Catholicism and Confucianism
5) Certainty of Salvation
6) Rationalization of Methodology
d) Religious Virtuosi

(H) Asceticism and Mysticism

1) Asceticism
a) Definition
b) World-rejection
c) Inner-worldly Asceticism

2) Mysticism
a) Mystical Illumination
b) Flight from the World
c) Mystical Union
d) Concentration upon Truth
e) Container vs. Instrument
f) Brokenness vs. Vocation
g) Anomie vs. Reformation
h) Mystic Love

3) Oriental Vs. Occidental Salvation
a) Concept of Divine
b) Knowledge vs. Action
c) Roman Law
d) Roman Rulership
e) Roman Church
f) Ascetic Protestantism

(I) Salvation by Other's Achievement

1) Salvation By Grace
a) Savior
b) Doctrines of Savior
c) Incarnation
d) Sacramental Grace
e) Institutional Grace
f) Catholic Institution
g) Dispensation and Conduct of Life
h) Confessional and Conduct of Life
i) Judaism and Ascetic Protestantism
j) Institutional Authority

2) Salvation By Faith
a) Faith and Magic
b) Faith of Islam and Judaism
c) Non-prophetic Faith
d) Dogmatic Faith
e) Explicit and Implicit Faith
f) Faith of Heart
g) Aristocracy of Dogma
h) Virtuoso of Faith
i) Faith and Intellect
j) Faith and Mysticism
k) Faith and Ethic
l) Idea of Vocation
m) Lutheran Faith
n) Faith and Carriers
o) Emotional Faith

3) Salvation By Predestination
a) Men of Predestination
b) Power of Predestination
c) Islamic vs. Puritan Predestination
d) Chinese Destiny
e) Aristocracy of Predestination
f) This-worldly Determinism

(J) Religious Ethics and the World

1) Internalization Of Religious Ethic
a) Ritualistic Religion
b) Ethic of Heart

2) Religious Ethic And Economics
a) Religious vs. Family Ethic
b) Religious vs. Neighborly Ethic
c) Alms-Giving
d) Protection of Weak
e) Religious Antipathy to Usury
f) Antipathy to Rational Economy
g) Economic Credit and Religion
h) Asceticism vs. Economy
i) Catholic Economic Life
j) Protestant Asceticism

3) Religious Ethics And Politics
a) Conditions of Religion and Politics
1) Ancient Political Religion
2) Rise of Religious Community
3) Religious Rejection of Politics
b) Tension between Religion And Politics
1) Absence of Conflict
2) Quaker Experiment
3) Political Indifference
4) Justifications of Violence
c) State and Christianity
1) Early Christianity
2) Medieval Christianity
d) Solution by Organic Ethic
1) Catholic Organic Ethic
2) Islamic Viewpoint
3) Indian Organic Ethic
4) Medieval Traditionalism of Vocation
e) Moder State and Religion

4) Religious Ethics And Sexuality
a) Sexual Orgy
b) Religious Hostility to Sexuality
c) Religious Regulation of Sexuality
d) Woman and Religion
e) Marriage
f) Rise of Eroticism

5) Religious Ethic And Art
a) Initial Intimacy between Religion and Art
b) Rise of Esthetic Intellectualism
c) Prophetic Antipathy of Art
d) Religious Interests in Art
e) Rational Religion's Rejection of Art

(K) Religions and the World

1) Judaism: World-accommodated
a) Absence of Asceticism
b) Jewish Economic Ethos
c) Double Standards of Morals
d) Jew, Catholic, and Puritan
e) Jewish Intellectualism
1) Jewish Ideal
2) Jesus' Opposition
3) Urban Judaism
f) Self-control
g) Jewish Rationalism
h) Lack of Asceticism
i) Paul's Breakthrough
j) Puritanism and Judaism

2) Islam: This-worldliness
a) Political Religion
b) No Salvation
c) Feudal Ethic
d) Contrast to Judaism and Christianity

3) Buddhism: World-rejection
a) Genuine Religion of Salvation
b) Transformation of Buddhism

4) Capitalism And Religion

5) Jesus: World-indifference
a) Jesus's Self-Consciousness
b) Salvational Heroism
c) Indifference to World

See also
Max Weber#Sociology of religion

References

External links

 

1920 non-fiction books
Sociology books
Works by Max Weber